Toni Perković (born April 10, 1998) is a Croatian professional basketball player currently playing for Orléans Loiret of the LNB Pro B. Standing at 1.91 m (6 ft 3 in), he plays as a Shooting guard. Perković won the 2017–18 A-1 League and the 2017 ABA Supercup with Cedevita, as well as two Croatian Cups (2018, 2019). He currently plays for the Croatia men's national basketball team.

Personal Life 
Toni is brother of professional football player Mauro Perkovic who currently plays for Dinamo Zagreb.

References

External links
 Basketball reference profile
 FIBA profile
 Eurobasket profile
 Euroleague profile
 ABA profile

1998 births
Living people
ABA League players
KK Cedevita players
KK Split players
Orléans Loiret Basket players
People from Pula
Point guards